Royall may refer to:

Surname
 Isaac Royall, Jr. (1719–1781), American landowner, gave land for Harvard Law School
 Anne Royall (1769–1854), travel writer and newspaper editor
 William B. Royall (1825–1895), US Army general
 J. Powell Royall (1874–1945), politician in Virginia, USA
 Kenneth Claiborne Royall (1894–1971), US Army general, Secretary of the Army
 Joe Royall (1912–1975), baseball player
 Kenneth Claiborne Royall, Jr. (1918–1999), politician in North Carolina, USA
 Robert V. Royall (born 1934), former US ambassador to Tanzania
 Janet Royall, Baroness Royall of Blaisdon (born 1955), British politician, principal of Somerville College, Oxford
 Paul Royall, BBC journalist

Given name
 Royall Tyler (1757–1826), American jurist and playwright
 Royall T. Wheeler (1810–1864), judge in Texas, USA
 Royall Tyler (historian) (1884–1953), American historian
 Royall T. Moore (1930–2014), American mycologist
 Royall Tyler (academic) (born 1936), scholar and translator of Japanese literature
 Royall H. Switzler (born 1938), politician in Massachusetts, USA

See also
 Royal (disambiguation)